Blue+ was a bi-monthly gay men's magazine from Australia that featured artistically composed images of nude and semi-nude men taken by top photographers from around the world. It also contained a variety of interviews and articles on art, films, music, culture, and travel. The magazine's format was oversized and it was sturdily bound on heavy paper; Blue was conceived as a "coffee table magazine." The magazine was launched in February 1995 under the name "(not only) Blue." It later changed to simply "Blue," and then in 2007 styled itself as "Blue+".

Publication
Blue was published by Studio Magazines of Sydney, New South Wales, Australia. Studio Magazines published a variety of art and fashion magazines, including Black+White, B+W Mode, Masters Weddings, Brides, Blue Mode, and Bambini.

See also
 List of LGBT publications

References

External links
 Official website

1995 establishments in Australia
2007 disestablishments in Australia
Bi-monthly magazines published in Australia
Defunct magazines published in Australia
Gay men's magazines published in Australia
Magazines established in 1995
Magazines disestablished in 2007
Magazines published in Sydney